Dmytro Stanislavovych Mykhaylenko (born 13 July 1973) is a retired Ukrainian defensive midfielder and current manager.

His son Ivan is also a player, a forward and older brother Oleksandr who played for FC Zirka Kirovohrad and FC Oleksandriya.

International career
He won the bronze medal in the FIFA World Youth Championship 1991 with the Soviet Union Under-20 team when only being 17 years old.

He was in the squad of Ukrainian U-21 team finished second in 1996 UEFA European Under-21 Football Championship Qualifying round group 4.

He made his senior team debut against Israel, 27 April 1993.

Post-retirement career
Upon retiring from football, Mykhaylenko became a commentator for Ukrainian Premier League football matches, debuting on 25 July 2009 in the home match of Dnipro - Metalist Kharkiv, in which Dnipro won 2:0.

Career statistics

Club

International

International goals

Honours

As player 
 Dynamo Kyiv
 Ukrainian Premier League (7): 1995, 1996, 1997, 1998, 1999, 2000, 2001
 Ukrainian Cup (4): 1996, 1998, 1999, 2000
 UEFA Champions' League semifinalist: 1999
 Dnipro
 Ukrainian Premier League runner-up: 1993
 Ukrainian Cup finalist: 2004
 APOP
 Cypriot Cup (1): 2008–09

As manager 
 Ukrainian First League: 2018–19
 Ukrainian Second League runner-up: 2017–18
 Ukrainian Premier League (youth): 2014–15

External links

References

1973 births
Living people
Sportspeople from Kropyvnytskyi
Soviet footballers
Ukraine international footballers
Ukraine under-21 international footballers
Ukrainian footballers
Ukrainian football managers
Association football midfielders
FC Zirka Kropyvnytskyi players
FC Dynamo Kyiv players
FC Dynamo-2 Kyiv players
FC Dynamo-3 Kyiv players
FC Metalurh Zaporizhzhia players
FC Dnipro players
Hapoel Tel Aviv F.C. players
Beitar Jerusalem F.C. players
APOP Kinyras FC players
Soviet Second League B players
Soviet Top League players
Ukrainian Premier League players
Ukrainian First League players
Ukrainian Second League players
Israeli Premier League players
Cypriot First Division players
Expatriate footballers in Israel
Expatriate footballers in Cyprus
Ukrainian expatriate footballers
Ukrainian expatriate football managers
Ukrainian expatriate sportspeople in Israel
Expatriate football managers in Cyprus
Ukrainian expatriate sportspeople in Cyprus
FC Dnipro managers
SC Dnipro-1 managers
Ukrainian Premier League managers
Ukrainian First League managers
Ukrainian Second League managers
Cypriot First Division managers
Pafos FC managers